Bellboy Donald is a 1942 Donald Duck  animated short film, produced in Technicolor by Walt Disney Productions, distributed by RKO Radio Pictures. This cartoon made the debut of Pete's son Pete Junior.

Plot
Donald Duck works as a bellboy in Lofty Manors hotel. After being reprimanded by the boss for his bad behaviour towards the guests, he is warned that if he makes one mistake, he will be fired for good. Donald promises to be a better bellboy and remember that "the guest is always right".

Just then, Pete and his son Pete Jr. arrive at the hotel. Remembering his promise, Donald goes out to greet them. However, Pete and his son slap and kick him and rip his uniform, which almost causes Donald to lose his temper.

Pete and his son go to check into their rooms on the 80th floor. In the process, Pete Jr. constantly kicks and sabotages Donald, and causes him to lose his clothes in the elevator. Donald asks for them back, but Pete Jr. refuses. He finally returns them and offers to buy Donald a bottle of strawberry soda, but messes with the elevator to make it go up and down at super-speed, only stopping when Donald begs him to, which causes him to crash headfirst onto the floor.

Unfortunately for Pete Jr., he has finally pushed Donald too far, and the enraged duck proceeds to repeatedly spank him and drag him to the boss. Donald asks if he's fired; upon learning that he is, he pulls Pete Jr. behind a vase and continues spanking him, ending the cartoon with an evil laugh to the camera.

Voice cast
Clarence Nash as Donald Duck
John McLeish as Pete
Glen Couch as Pete Jr.
John Dehner as hotel manager

Home media
The short was released on December 6, 2005 on Walt Disney Treasures: The Chronological Donald, Volume Two: 1942-1946.

Television
This short was part of "Donald Duck's 50th Birthday".

References

External links
 
 

1942 films
1942 animated films
1942 short films
1940s Disney animated short films
Donald Duck short films
Films directed by Jack King
Films produced by Walt Disney
Films scored by Oliver Wallace
RKO Pictures short films
RKO Pictures animated short films
Films set in hotels
Films with screenplays by Carl Barks